English version school is a system of education in Bangladesh that follows the Bangla medium school curriculum and based upon textbooks translated from the Bengali language into English. There are approximately 52 English version schools in Dhaka. In 2011 the first Internet based English version school opened in Gazipur.

History 
The government of Bangladesh opened the first English version schools in cadet colleges in the late 1990s.

English version is different from English medium schools. While English medium schools follow the curriculum of Edexcel or Cambridge International Examination, English version schools follow the national curriculum and hold national examinations in English. English versions schools are usually less costly than English medium schools.

Zia Hasan International School  in Tangail and Dinajpur Laboratory School & College in Dinajpur in 2010 became the first English version schools in a rural area.

References

Education in Bangladesh
English-language education
Education systems
Language education in Bangladesh